Manuela Grillo (Pavia, 9 May 1977) is a former Italian sprinter.

She won three medals, to senior level, with the national relay team at the International athletics competitions.

Biography
Manuela Grillo also participated, at individual level, at one edition of the IAAF World Indoor Championships in Athletics (2001), she has 22 caps in national team from 1995 to 2007.

In 2011, after her athlete career, she is dedicated to cycling, touching, but not reaching, the qualification to the 2012 Summer Olympic.

Achievements

National titles
Manuela Grillo has won two times the individual national championship.
2 wins in the 60 metres indoor (2001, 2006)

See also
 Italy national relay team
 Italian all-time lists - 4x100 metres relay

References

External links
 

1977 births
Italian female sprinters
Sportspeople from Pavia
Living people
Mediterranean Games silver medalists for Italy
Mediterranean Games bronze medalists for Italy
Athletes (track and field) at the 2001 Mediterranean Games
Athletes (track and field) at the 2005 Mediterranean Games
World Athletics Championships athletes for Italy
Mediterranean Games medalists in athletics